Rancho San Lorenzo was a  Mexican land grant given in 1841 by Governor Juan Alvarado to Guillermo Castro a career soldier posted to the Pueblo of San José. The land grant included present day Hayward, San Lorenzo, and Castro Valley, including Crow Canyon, Cull Canyon, and Palomares Canyons.

History
The grant was located on the route of El Camino Viejo.  

Castro's grant was patented in 1865.  Soon after, Castro began to sell off his land to pay debts.  The last of his holding was sold in a sheriff's sale in 1864 to Faxon Atherton.  Atherton in turn began selling off his portion in smaller parcels.

Rancho San Lorenzo (Sota)
Guillermo and Maria Louisa Peralta Castro owned Rancho San Lorenzo Alta. Francisco and Barbara Soto owned an adjacent rancho called Rancho San Lorenzo Baja - sometimes called San Lorenzito, or Little San Lorenzo. Barbara Soto was Guillermo Castro's sister.

See also

References

External links
 Ranchos San Lorenzo (Castro y Soto), at The Bancroft Library

San Lorenzo
San Lorenzo
Hayward, California
El Camino Viejo
San Lorenzo